Fred Anderson (born July 16, 1944) is an American educator and politician. He serves as a Republican member of the Montana House of Representatives, where he represents District 20, including parts of Great Falls, Montana.

Early life 
On July 16, 1944, Anderson was born in Bozeman, Montana.

Education 
In 1967, Anderson earned a Bachelor of Science degree in broadfield science with minors in chemistry and automotive technology from Northern Montana College. In 1979, Anderson earned a MEd in Vocational Administration from Colorado State University. In 1980, Anderson earned a PhD in Administration and Supervision from Colorado State University.

Career 
In military, Anderson served in the Montana Army National Guard.

Anderson is a cattle rancher in Montana.

In 1968, Anderson became a teacher at Miles Community College, until 1978.
In 1979, Anderson became an Assistant Principal in Miles City, Montana. In 1982, Anderson became a Principal in Great Falls, Montana.

In 2014, Anderson ran for election to represent the 24th district, but lost the general election to Democrat Jean Price by 23 votes.

On November 8, 2016, Anderson won the election and became a Republican member of Montana House of Representatives for District 20. Anderson defeated Amy Rapp with 71.03% of the votes.

On November 6, 2018, as an incumbent, Anderson won the election and continued serving District 20. Anderson defeated Keaton Sunchild with 68.48% of the votes.

While Anderson was a Principal of Custer County District High School from 1982-2002, James Jensen, an athletic trainer, was allegedly sexually abused students there. In 2019, Anderson faced pressure from a county Republican leader to resign from his legislative position.

Awards 
 2019 Champion of Business award. Presented by Montana Chamber of Commerce.
 2019 Silver Windmill award. Presented by Montana Farm Bureau.

Election history

2014

2016

2018

Personal life 
Anderson's wife is Vicky Anderson. They have 3 children. Anderson and his family live in Great Falls, Montana.

In 2018, Anderson underwent a kidney transplant in Arizona. Anderson received a kidney from Jim Ross, a former U.S. Navy pilot and a friend.

References

1944 births
Living people
People from Bozeman, Montana
Politicians from Great Falls, Montana
Republican Party members of the Montana House of Representatives
21st-century American politicians
Montana State University–Northern alumni
Montana State University alumni
Montana National Guard personnel